National Olympic Committees that wish to host an Olympic Games select cities within their territories to put forth bids for the Olympic Games. The staging of the Paralympic Games is automatically included in the bid. Since the creation of the International Olympic Committee (IOC) in 1894, which successfully appropriated the name of the Ancient Greek Olympics to create a modern sporting event, interested cities have rivaled for selection as host of the Summer or Winter Olympic Games.
51 different cities have been chosen to host the modern Olympics: three in Eastern Europe, five in East Asia, one in South America, three in Oceania, nine in North America and all the others in Western Europe. No Central American, African, Central Asian, Middle Eastern, South Asian, or Southeast Asian city has ever been chosen to host an Olympics.

Recent decisions have been made at IOC Sessions seven to eleven years from the games; for example, the 2020 Summer Olympics were awarded to Tokyo on 7 September 2013, the 2022 Winter Olympics were awarded to Beijing on 31 July 2015, the 2024 Summer Olympics were awarded to Paris on 13 September 2017, the 2026 Winter Olympics were awarded to Milan-Cortina d'Ampezzo on 24 June 2019, the 2028 Summer Olympics were awarded to Los Angeles on 13 September 2017 and the 2032 Summer Olympics were awarded to Brisbane on 21 July 2021.

IOC – IPC co-operation
In June 2001, the International Olympic Committee (IOC) and the International Paralympic Committee (IPC) signed an agreement that would ensure that the staging of the Paralympic Games is automatically included in the bid for the Olympic Games. The agreement came into effect at the 2008 Paralympic Summer Games in Beijing, and the 2010 Paralympic Winter Games in Vancouver.  However, the Salt Lake 2002 Organizing Committee (SLOC), chose to follow the practice of "one bid, one city" already at the 2002 Games in Salt Lake City, with one Organizing Committee for both Games, which was followed up by the 2004 Games in Athens.  The agreement was adjusted in 2003. An extension was signed in June 2006.

Games of the Olympiad

Olympic Winter Games

Bidding cities

Trivia
 London is the only city to have bid more than once and never lost a bid.
 Detroit has had the most bids whilst failing to win the rights to host the games once.
 Los Angeles has had the most bids in the Summer Games.
 Cortina d'Ampezzo and Lake Placid have had the most bids in the Winter Games.
 Hungary has had the most bids in the Summer Games that have failed to win the rights to host the games at least once, with six bids--all from Budapest. This also ties it with Turkey for most bids for Olympic Games in general without a successful bid (Turkey has bid for the Summer Games five  times and the Winter Games once).
 Sweden has had the most bids in the Winter Games that have failed to win the rights to host the games at least once, with nine bids.
 Beijing is the only city to host both the Summer and Winter Games.
 Helsinki, Milan, Montreal, Stockholm and Munich have each been selected as hosts for either the Summer or Winter Games while also bidding unsuccessfully for the other Games. Minneapolis has bid for the Summer and Winter Games but has never been selected.

Notes

References

See also 
 List of bids for the Summer Olympics
 List of bids for the Winter Olympics

External links
 GamesBids.com
 TheBidLibrary.com
 International Olympic Committee (IOC) — Olympic Games
 IOC Vote History
 Olympic Games Museum
 Olympic Bid Election History